This article gives an overview of liberalism in Belgium. Liberalism was a dominant force since the Belgian independence from the Netherlands. It is limited to liberal parties with substantial support, mainly proved by having had a representation in parliament. The sign ⇒ denotes another party in that scheme. For inclusion in this scheme it is not necessary that parties labeled themselves as a liberal party.

History
Since 1972 the traditional liberal current is divided in parties for each language. In Flanders the liberal Flemish Liberals and Democrats (Vlaamse Liberalen en Democraten, member LI, ELDR), comprising both market and left of center liberals, is one of the dominant parties. Smaller liberal parties are Spirit, allied with the social democrats, and Vivant, allied to the VLD. In the French-speaking part of the country the nowadays center liberal Reformist Movement (Mouvement Réformateur, member LI, ELDR) is one of the major parties.  Affiliated with this party is the German-speaking Party for Freedom and Progress (Partei für Freiheit und Fortschritt).

Liberal Party/Party for Freedom and Progress 
1846: Liberals formed the Liberal Party (Parti Libéral)
1887: A radical faction seceded as the ⇒ Progressive Party
1900: The ⇒ Progressive Party rejoined the party
The party name gradually included the Dutch version Liberale Partij (LP/PL)
1961: The LP/PL is reorganised into Party for Freedom and Progress (Partij voor Vrijheid en Vooruitgang/Parti pour la Liberté et le Progrès) (PVV/PLP)
1972: The PVV/PLP fell apart in three parties with the same name in the three state languages (French, Dutch and German)

Progressive Party 
1887: A radical faction of the ⇒ Liberal Party formed the Progressive Party (Parti Progressiste)
1900: The PP merged into the ⇒ Liberal Party

(Flemish) Party for Freedom and Progress/Flemish Liberals and Democrats 
1972: The Flemish section of the ⇒ PVV/PLP formed the Party for Freedom and Progress (Partij voor Vrijheid en Vooruitgang)
1992: The PVV is reorganised into the present-day Flemish Liberals and Democrats (Vlaamse Liberalen en Democraten or VLD)

(Francophone) Party for Freedom and Progress/Liberal Reformist Party 
1972: The francophone section of the ⇒ PVV/PLP became the Party for Freedom and Progress (Parti pour la Liberté et le Progrès)
1973: The Brussels section of the PLP formed the ⇒ Liberal Party
1976: The PLP merged with a faction of the Walloon Rally (Rassemblement Wallon) into the Party for Reforms and Freedom of Wallonia (Parti pour les Réformes et la Liberté de Wallonie)
1979: The party merged with the ⇒ Liberal Party into the Reformist Liberal Party (Parti Réformateur Libéral)
2002: The PRL is reorganised into the present-day Reformist Movement (Mouvement Réformateur or MR)

(Brussels) Liberal Party 
1973: The Brussels section of the ⇒ PLP formed the Liberal Party (Parti Libéral)
1979: The Liberal Party merged into the ⇒ Liberal Reform Party

(German speaking) Party for Freedom and Progress 
1976: The German-speaking section of the ⇒ PLP became the present-day Party for Freedom and Progress (Partei für Freiheit und Fortschritt)
2002: The PFF became affiliated to the ⇒ Reformist Movement

Libertine party during the 1990s 
ROSSEM, defunct, around Jean-Pierre Van Rossem.

New liberal parties formed in the 2000s 
FlemishProgressives (left-liberalism), cartel partner of the Different Socialist Party.
Vivant (social-liberalism), cartel partner of the VLD.
Liberal Appeal (right-liberalism), cartel partner of the VLD.
Veilig Blauw-Safe Blue (right-liberalism), local party, defunct.
Verstandig Rechts-Smart Right (right-liberalism), local party, defunct.
VLOTT (far-right liberalism), cartel partner of the Vlaams Belang.
List Dedecker (populist right-liberalism).
Liberal Democrats (right-liberalism), inspired by New Flemish Alliance.

Liberal leaders
Parti Libéral
Charles Rogier
Walthère Frère-Orban (1812-1896), wrote the first charter of the liberal party
Paul Janson
Paul Hymans
Paul-Emile Janson
Mouvement Réformateur
Charles Michel
Vlaamse Liberalen en Democraten
Guy Verhofstadt

Liberal thinkers
In the Contributions to liberal theory the following Belgian thinkers are included:

Dirk Verhofstadt (born 1955)
Boudewijn Bouckaert

See also 
 Liberal Archive
 History of Belgium
 Politics of Belgium
 List of political parties in Belgium

 
Politics of Belgium